Atar, Atash, or Azar is the Zoroastrian concept of holy fire, sometimes described in abstract terms as "burning and unburning fire" or "visible and invisible fire" (Mirza, 1987:389). It is considered to be the visible presence of Ahura Mazda and his Asha through the eponymous Yazata. The rituals for purifying a fire are performed 1,128 times a year.

In the Avestan language, ātar is an attribute of sources of heat and light, of which the nominative singular form is ātarš, source of Persian ātaš (fire). It was once thought to be etymologically related to the Avestan āθrauuan / aθaurun (Vedic atharvan), a type of priest, but that is now considered unlikely (Boyce, 2002:16). The ultimate etymology of ātar, previously unknown (Boyce, 2002:1), is now believed to be from the Indo-European *hxehxtr- 'fire'. This would make it related to Latin ater (black) and possibly a cognate of Albanian vatër, Romanian vatră and Serbo-Croatian vatra (fire).

In later Zoroastrianism, ātar (Middle Persian: 𐭠𐭲𐭥𐭥𐭩 ādar or ādur) is iconographically conflated with fire itself, which in Middle Persian is 𐭠𐭲𐭧𐭱 ātaxsh, one of the primary objects of Zoroastrian symbolism.

In scripture

In the Gathic texts
Atar is already evident in the Gathas, the oldest texts of the compendium of the Avesta and believed to have been composed by Zoroaster himself. At this juncture, as in the Yasna Haptanghaiti (the seven-chapter Yasna that structurally interrupts the Gathas and is linguistically as old as the Gathas themselves), atar is still—with only one exception—an abstract concept simply an instrument, a medium, of the Creator and is not yet the divinity (yazata) of heat and light that atar was to become in the later texts.

In the most ancient texts, atar is a medium, a faculty, through which judgement is passed and reflects the pre-Zoroastrian institution of ordeal by heat (Avestan: garmo-varah, heat ordeal; cf. Boyce 1996:ch. 6). Justice is administered through atar (Yasna 31.3, 34.4, 36.2, 47.2), the blazing atar (31.19, 51.9), through the heat of atar (43.4), through the blazing, shining, molten metal (ayangha Khshushta, 30.7, 32.7, 51.9). An individual who has passed the fiery test, has attained physical and spiritual strength, wisdom, truth and love with serenity (30.7). However, among all the references to atar in the oldest texts, it is only once addressed independently of Ahura Mazda. In this exception, atar is spoken of in the third person masculine singular: "He detects sinners by hand-grasping" (Yasna 34.4). Altogether, "there are said to have been some 30 kinds of fiery tests in all." (Boyce, 2002:1)

Also in the early texts, tangential to its role in establishing guilt, atar is the light of revelation through which Zoroaster is selected by Ahura Mazda, the Zarathushtra Mainyu Athra (Yasna 31.3), radiated by Ahura Mazda (43.9), bearing the conviction of "Good Purpose"  (Vohu Manah, 43.4; see also Amesha Spenta), and enlightening one's inner-self (46.7). Within this framework of the concept of divine illumination, atar radiates the "other lights" (31.7), the essence (of Ahura Mazda) from which insight and wisdom permeate the universe. So also Zoroaster's injunction to always pray in the presence of atar—either towards the sun, or towards their own hearths—so as to better concentrate their devotions on asha, righteousness, and the virtue that should be striven for (Yasna 43.9, see also Boyce, 1975:455).

In later texts

The Gathic role of atar as the medium for detecting guilt is not directly evident in the later texts of the Avesta, but reappears in modified form as an allegory of burning and annihilating the Angra Mainyu through righteousness, "where Asha Vahishta is identified at times with the household fire on the hearth." There, "identification in the realms of matter and of spirit serves only to bring more into prominence the main tenets of Zoroaster's teachings in regard to Asha" (Dhalla, 1938:170). A vestige of the ancient institution of ordeal by heat is nonetheless present in Vendidad 4.54–55, where speaking against the truth and violating the sanctity of promise is punishable by flogging and is detected by the consumption of "water, blazing, of golden color, having the power to detect guilt." The Zend translation/commentary on this passage translates "blazing" as "having brimstone and sulphur", and notes that innocence or guilt was established by the consumption of this "guilt-detecting liquid". Similarly, in the Denkard, Adharbad Maraspand—the Sassanid era high-priest to whom the collation of the Avesta texts is attributed—is purported to have nine measures of "unburning molten zinc" applied to his chest as proof of accuracy of the sacred texts.

Seen chronologically, the transition from atar as a vehicle of judgement to Atar Yazata the divinity presiding over blazing fire is abrupt. While the older Gathic Avestan texts have heat (and thus fire) associated with harsh judgement, the Younger Avestan texts have the divinity Atar completely representing and being represented by fire itself; and associated with warmth and light and essential for growth. Asha Vahishta's association with atar is however carried forward, and they are often mentioned together (Yasna 62.3, Nyashes 5.9, etc.). So also in their roles as protectors, for "when the Evil Spirit assailed the creation of Good Truth, Good Thought and Fire intervened" (Yasht 13.77)

It is in the later texts that Atar  is personified as "the son" of Ahura Mazda (standard appellation, Yasna 25.7 et al.) and is addressed as "full of glory and full of healing remedies" (Nyash 5.6). In Yasna 17.11, Atar is "master of the house", recalling the role of the hearth fire in the Gathas. The same passage enumerates the "five kinds of fire":
 atar berezi-savah, "the highly beneficent atar" (compare "oxygen"), qualified in Zend texts as "the fire that eats food but drinks no water", and the kind of fire that burns in an Atash-Behram, the highest grade of fire temple.
 atar vohu-fryana, "the atar of good affection" (compare "fire", cognate with bhaga and friend), later qualified as "the fire diffusing goodness", and "the  fire that consumes both water and food".
 atar urvazishta, "the atar of greatest bliss" (compare "warmth), later qualified as "the fire of happy life", and "the fire that drinks water but eats no food".
 atar vazishta, "the atar most swift" (compare "electric sparks"), later qualified as the fire in clouds, i.e. lightning, and as "the fire that neither drinks water nor eats food".
 atar spenishta, "the atar most holy", (compare  "Aether", cognate Balto-Slavic šventas "holy") ( described in "Zend" texts as "the fire of prosperity" and as the spiritual fire burning before Ohrmuzd.
The description of the fires in the Sassanid era commentaries (the Zend texts) differs slightly from those described in the Bundahishn ("Original Creation", completed in the 11th or 12th century). In the latter, the description of the first and last kind of fire is reversed.

In culture and tradition

As a divinity
During the late Achaemenid era, adar—as the quintessence of the Yazata Adar—was incorporated in the Zoroastrian hierarchy of divinities. In that position, Adar aids Asha Vahishta (Avestan, Middle Persian: Ardvahisht), the Amesha Spenta responsible for the luminaries. From among the flowers associated with the Yazatas, Adar's is the marigold (calendula) (Bundahishn 27.24).

The importance of the divinity Adar is evident from a dedication to the entity in the Zoroastrian calendar: Adar is one of the only five Yazatas that have a month-name dedication. Additionally, Adar is the name of the ninth day of the month in the Zoroastrian religious calendar, and the ninth month of the year of the civil Iranian calendar of 1925 (modern Persian: Azar) which has month-names derived from those used by the Zoroastrian calendar.

In Zoroastrian cosmogony, Adar was the seventh of the seven creations of the material universe. It is only with Adar's assistance, who serves as the life-force, that the other six creations begin their work (Bundahishn 3.7–8; more logically explained in Zatspram 3.77–83).

The cult of fire
Although Zoroastrians revere fire in any form, the temple fire is not literally for the reverence of fire, but together with clean water (see Aban), is an agent of ritual purity. Clean, white "ash for the purification ceremonies [is] regarded as the basis of ritual life", which "are essentially the rites proper to the tending of a domestic fire, for the temple cult is that of the hearth fire raised to a new solemnity" (Boyce, 1975:455). For, "the man who sacrifices unto fire with fuel in his hand, with the Baresman in his hand, with milk in his hand, with the mortar for crushing the branches of the sacred Haoma in his hand, is given happiness" (Yasna 62.1; Nyashes 5.7) 

The Zoroastrian cult of fire is apparently much younger than Zoroastrianism itself and appears at approximately the same time as the shrine cult, first evident in the 4th century BCE (roughly contemporaneous with the introduction of Adar as a divinity). There is no allusion to a temple cult of fire in the Avesta proper, nor is there any old Persian language word for one. Moreover, Boyce suggests that the temple cult of fire was instituted in opposition to the image/shrine cult and "no actual ruins of a fire temple have been identified from before the Parthian period" (Boyce, 1975:454).

That the cult of fire was a doctrinal modification and absent from early Zoroastrianism is still evident in the later Atash Nyash: in the oldest passages of that liturgy, it is the hearth fire that speaks to "all those for whom it cooks the evening and morning meal", which Boyce observes is not consistent with sanctified fire. The temple cult is an even later development: From Herodotus it is known that in the mid-5th century BCE the Zoroastrians worshipped to the open sky, ascending mounds to light their fires (The Histories, i.131). Strabo confirms this, noting that in the 6th century, the sanctuary at Zela in Cappadocia was an artificial mound, walled in, but open to the sky (Geographica XI.8.4.512).

By the Parthian era (250 BCE–226 CE), Zoroastrianism had in fact two kinds of places of worship: One, apparently called bagin or ayazan, sanctuaries dedicated to a specific divinity, constructed in honor of the patron Yazata of an individual or family and included an icon or effigy of the honored.  The second were the atroshan, the "places of burning fire", which as Boyce (1997:ch. 3) notes, became more and more prevalent as the iconoclastic movement gained support. Following the rise of the Sassanid dynasty, the shrines to the Yazatas continued to exist, with the statues—by law—either being abandoned as empty sanctuaries, or being replaced by fire altars (so also the popular shrines to Meher/Mithra which retained the name Darb-e Mehr—Mithra's Gate—that is today one of the Zoroastrian technical terms for a fire temple).

Also, as Schippman observed (loc. Cit. Boyce, 1975:462), even during the Sassanid era (226–650 CE) there is no evidence that the fires were categorized according to their sanctity. "It seems probable that there were virtually only two, namely the Atash-i Vahram [literally: "victorious fire", later misunderstood to be the Fire of Bahram, see Gnoli, 2002:512] and the lesser Atash-i Adaran, or 'Fire of Fires', a parish fire, as it were, serving a village or town quarter" (Boyce, 1975:462; Boyce 1966:63). Apparently, it was only in the Atash-i Vahram that fire was kept continuously burning, with the Adaran fires being annually relit. While the fires themselves had special names, the structures did not, and it has been suggested that "the prosaic nature of the middle Persian names (kadag, man, and xanag are all words for an ordinary house) perhaps reflect a desire on the part of those who fostered the temple-cult [...] to keep it as close as possible in character to the age-old cult of the hearth-fire, and to discourage elaboration" (Boyce, 2002:9).

The Indian Parsi-Zoroastrian practice of rendering the term athornan (derived from the Avestan language "athravan") as "fire-priest" in the English language is based on the mistaken assumption that the athra* prefix derives from atar (Boyce, 2002:16–17). The term athravan does not appear in the Gathas, where a priest is a zaotar, and in its oldest attested use (Yasna 42.6) the term appears to be synonymous with "missionary". In the later Yasht 13.94, Zoroaster himself is said to have been an athravan, which in this context could not be a reference to atar if a cult of fire and its associated priesthood did not yet exist in Zoroaster's time. Thus, in all probability, "the word athravan has a different derivation." (Boyce, 2002:17)

In mythology and folklore
In Vendidad 1, Adar battles Aži Dahāka, the great dragon of the sky.

In Ferdowsi's Shahnameh, Hoshang, the grandson of the first man Gayomard, discovers fire in a rock. He recognizes it as the divine glory of Ahura Mazda, offers homage to it, and instructs his people to so as well. Also in the Shahnameh is the legend of Sevavash, who passes through "the unburning fire" as proof of his innocence.

As a royal symbol

During the Sassanid era (226–650 CE), the symbol of Fire plays much the same role that the winged sun Faravahar did during the Achaemenid period (648–330 BCE). Beginning with Ardashir I, the founder of the Sassanid Empire, many of the kings of the dynasty issued one or more coins with a symbol of Fire on the verso, and seals and bullae with the fire symbol were common. 

The first silver coins of the empire have helmeted busts of Ardashir I (r. 226–241) or his father Papak on the obverse (a figure of the ruling monarch on the obverse is consistent throughout the dynasty), with a representation of a fire altar, accompanied by the legend atash i artakhshir, "Fire of Ardeshir", on the reverse. Ardashir's son, Shapur I (r. 241–272), has much the same image but adds two attendants at the fire altar. On the coins of Hormizd I (also known as Ardashir II, r. 272–273), the emperor himself tends the fire with the help of an attendant. Bahram II (276–293) also appears himself, accompanied by what may be his queen and son. Narseh (r. 293–303) also attends the fire himself, this time alone.  On the coins of Shapur III (r. 283–388), a divinity appears to be emerging from the fire. The shape of the fire altar in the coins of Yazdegerd II (r. 438–457) are similar to those in present-day fire temples. The legend introduced under Ardeshir yields to a mint mark and year of issue under Peroz (r. 457–484), a feature evident in all the coins of the remaining dynasty.

See also
 Aban, "the waters", which is of similar importance to Zoroastrianism.
 The Gathas, the most sacred texts of the Avesta
 Yazatas and Amesha Spentas as Zoroastrian divinities
 Dedication to Adar in the Zoroastrian calendar
 Agni
 Luminiferous aether
 Eitr, original substance of the original being, Ymir, in the old Norse cosmology
 Eternal flame

References

Bibliography
 

  
 
 
 
  
 
 
 
 
  In

Further reading
 

Ancient Iranian deities
Ancient Iranian religion
Persian mythology
Yazatas
Fire in religion
Zoroastrian symbols